Vichy is a city in the Allier department in the Auvergne-Rhône-Alpes region of central France, in the historic province of Bourbonnais.

It is a spa and resort town and in World War II was the capital of Vichy France from 1940 to 1944. The term Vichyste indicated collaboration with the Vichy regime, often carrying a pejorative connotation.

In 2021, the town became part of the transnational UNESCO World Heritage Site under the name "Great Spa Towns of Europe" because of its famous baths and its architectural testimony to the popularity of spa towns in Europe from the 18th through 20th centuries.

Name
Vichy is the French form of the Occitan name of the town, of uncertain etymology. Dauzat & al. have proposed that it derived from an unattested Latin name referencing the most important regional landowner (presumably a "Vippius") during the time of the Roman emperor Diocletian's administrative reorganizations and land surveys at the end of the 3rd century AD.

Until the 18th century, it was also common to use (e), which derived from the Occitan name of the town.

Geography and geology 
Vichy lies on the banks of the river Allier. The source of the Allier is in the nearby Massif Central plateau which lies only a few miles to the south, near the region's capital, Clermont-Ferrand.

The historical existence of volcanic activity in the Massif Central is somewhat visually evident. Volcanic eruptions have happened for at least 150,000 years, but all volcanoes there have been dormant for at least 112 years. Volcanic activity in the area is the direct cause of the many thermal springs that exist in and around Vichy.

The famous mineral springs in Vichy are rich in trace elements such as lithium and fluorine, and high in sodium bicarbonate. The temperatures of the spring range from 73 degrees C at Antoine Spring to 14 degrees C at Lafayette Spring. In total, about 289 springs have been charted in Vichy and its surroundings. These springs are derived from infiltration through Oligocene-period sedimentary rocks, part of the Limagne Graben collapse basin.

Climate
The city enjoys an oceanic climate. Rainfall is moderate around Vichy, averaging about  annually.

History

Roman era 
The first known settlement at Vichy was established by Roman legionaries in 52BC. During the first two centuries AD, Vichy became fairly prosperous because of the supposed medicinal value of the thermal springs.

Middle Ages 
On 2 September 1344, John II of France ceded the noble fiefdom of Vichy to Peter I, Duke of Bourbon. On 6 December 1374, the last part of Vichy was acquired by Louis II, Duke of Bourbon. At that point Vichy was incorporated into the House of Bourbon. In 1410, a Celestinian monastery was founded with twelve monks. A building located above the Celestinian Spring is still visible.

In 1527, the House of Bourbon was incorporated into the French Kingdom. By the end of the 16th century, the mineral baths had obtained a reputation for having quasi-miraculous curing powers and attracted patients from the noble and wealthy classes. Government officials, such as Fouet and Chomel, began to classify the curing properties of the mineral baths.

Vichy's thermal baths 
Marie de Rabutin-Chantal, marquise de Sévigné was a patient in 1676 and 1677 and would popularize Vichy's Thermal Baths through the written descriptions in her letters. The Vichy waters were said to have cured the paralysis in her hands, thus enabling her to take up letter-writing. In 1761 and 1762, Adélaïde and Victoire of France, the daughters of Louis XV, came to Vichy for the first time and returned in 1785. The bath facilities seemed extremely uncomfortable to them because of the muddy surroundings and insufficient access. When they returned to Versailles, they asked their nephew Louis XVI to build roomier and more luxurious thermal baths, which were subsequently completed in 1787.

In 1799, Laetitia Bonaparte, mother of Napoleon, came to be cured with her son Louis. Under the Empire, Le Parc des Sources, was created on the Emperor's orders. (Decree of Gumbinen of 1812).

Under Charles X, the great increase in patients wishing to be healed at the springs led to an expansion of the hydrotherapeutic facilities. Princess Marie-Thérèse-Charlotte expanded the Janson buildings under the plan of Rose – Beauvais (work completed in 1830).

Vichy in style 
By the 19th century Vichy was a station à la mode, attended by many celebrities. However, it was the stays of Napoleon III between 1861 and 1866 that were to cause the most profound transformation of the city: dikes were built along the Allier,  of landscaped gardens replaced the old marshes and, along the newly laid-out boulevards and the streets, chalets and pavilions were built for the Emperor and his court. Recreational pursuits were not spared; in view of the park, a large casino was built by the architect Badger in 1865. The Emperor would be the catalyst of the development of a small rail station, which increased the number of inhabitants and visitors tenfold in fifty years.

After the Second French Empire, the Belle Époque marked the second large construction campaign in Vichy. In 1903, the Opera House (l'Opéra), the Hall of Springs and a large bath designed in the eastern style were inaugurated. In 1900, the Parc des Sources was enclosed by a metal gallery which came from the World Fair of 1889.  long, it is decorated by a frise de chardons and was completed by the ironworker Emile Robert. Many private mansions with varied architectural styles were erected during the first half of the 20th century.

Vichy welcomed 40,000 curistes in 1900, and that figure had risen to nearly 100,000 just before the onset of the First World War. La vie thermale had its heyday in the 1930s. The success in treating ailments that was attributed to the Vichy Baths led la Compagnie Fermière to enlarge the Baths again by creating the Callou and Lardy Baths. The Art Nouveau-style Opéra, inaugurated in 1903, accommodated all the great names on the international scene. Vichy became the summertime music capital of France, but the war of 1914 would put a brutal end to that development.

Vichy France – seat of the French State, the pro-German collaborationist government 

Following the armistice signed on 22 June 1940, the zone which was not occupied by the Germans took the name of the French State (État Français) (as opposed to the traditional name, République Française or French Republic) and set up its capital in Vichy on 1 July, because of the town's relative proximity to Paris (4.5 hours by train) and because it was the city with the second largest hotel capacity at the time. Moreover, the existence of a modern telephone exchange made it possible to reach the whole world via phone.

On 1 July, the government took possession of many hotels. Six hundred members of the French Parliament (Appointed Members and Senators) would come to Vichy for the meeting of the Chambers. On 9 and 10 July, in the main auditorium of the Opera House, the members of Parliament voted for the end of the Third Republic. The republican system was abolished, and the French State, with Philippe Pétain at its helm as Head of State, replaced it. Only 80 of the 600 members of Parliament voiced their opposition.

Starting from this date, Vichy would be, for more than four years, the de facto capital of the French State.  Paris was still the official capital, although the Vichy France government never operated from there.  This government is often called the Vichy Regime.  The term "Vichyste," which designates partisans of this regime, should not be confused with "Vichyssois" which designates the inhabitants of the city. The latter term is sometimes used erroneously to designate Pétain's supporters.

Reine des villes d'eaux 
The 1950s and 1960s would become the most ostentatious period for Vichy, complete with parading personalities, visits from crowned heads (The Glaoui, the Pasha of Marrakech, Prince Rainier III of Monaco) and profits from a massive influx of North African French clients who holidayed in Vichy, spending lavishly. There were thirteen cinemas (which sometimes showed special previews), eight dance halls and three theatres. It was at this period that the station would take the title of "Reine des villes d'eaux" (Queen of the Spa Towns).

From June to September, so many French-Algerian tourists were arriving that it almost seemed like there was an airlift set up between Vichy-Charmeil and the airports of Algeria. Mayor Pierre Coulon (1950–1967) decided to create Lake Allier (10 June 1963) and Omnisports Park (1963–68), giving the city its current look.

Decline of Vichy 
The war in Algeria (1950s-60s), which led to decolonization, marked once again a halt in the prosperity of this city, which from then on had to deal with much less favorable conditions. The need to continue to pay the debts incurred by the considerable investments that had been made in more prosperous times obligated the new mayor, Jacques Lacarin (1967–1989), the successor of Pierre Coulon, to adopt a much more careful policy of management.

Modern revival 
Claude Malhuret, former Minister of Human Rights, born in Strasbourg in 1950, was mayor from 1989 to 2017. He and Bernard Kouchner are the co-founders of Doctors Without Borders (Médecins Sans Frontières). The city and its economic partners have concluded an important program of restoration and modernization. These projects include:
 creation of a vast pedestrian zone in the city center
 a program of modernization
 upgrading of hotels to the sector standards
 rebuilding and restoration of the thermal baths
 organization of a balneotherapy center dedicated to well-being
 development of the architectural heritage
 construction of a congress center within the old Casino, and
 restoration of the Opera
 rebuilding of the covered market, called "Grand Marché" (2006)
 restoration of the train station and surroundings (2009)
 restoration of the "Rue de Paris", a main street in the city centre (2010)

Administration

Population

Economy 
The city was first noted for its thermal cures in Roman times. Its waters come from springs such as the Vichy Celestins and Vichy Saint-Yorre.

Vichy Pastilles (made in Vichy) are octagon-shaped candies made from soda contained in the spring waters.

The health and beauty business, with the laboratories of the L'Oréal company, also make it possible to publicize the city's name to a worldwide audience under the Vichy brand. (This French website discusses the history of this brand.)

Unlike the neighbouring communes on the Allier such as industrial Montluçon and administrative seat Moulins, Vichy's economy is centred on the tertiary sector, with companies like the Compagnie de Vichy developing the health and well-being sector to mitigate the decline of medical hydrotherapy. The local market, open on Sundays, attracts shoppers from tens of kilometres around.

The closing of two important local employers, the Manurhin company and the Sediver company, has reduced employment in the Vichy basin. Job creation by developing companies such as the NSE electronics company or the Satel call center company may not completely compensate for the removal of jobs which will result from this, despite the internet tour operator Karavel's establishment of a new call center in May 2005.

Nevertheless, the two most important employers of the city belong to the public sector: the hospital (1,120 employees), and the town hall (500).

Since 1989 Vichy has been one of the 7 sites of the European Total Quality Institute (Institut Européen de la Qualité Totale).

The Pôle Universitaire de Vichy (previously called Pôle Universitaire et Technologique Lardy), born from a project of thermal waste land rehabilitation and launched during the mid-nineties, is an economic priority. This  campus accommodates 600 students in the downtown area, in ten areas of study including the fields of biotechnology, international trade, multi-media and languages.

The CAVILAM - Alliance Française (Centre of Live Approaches to Languages and the Media), receives students from diverse countries who want to learn French.  Created in 1964, under the impulse of the Universities of Clermont-Ferrand and the city of Vichy, CAVILAM - Alliance Française, joined the international network of the Alliance Française in 2012. After the first the COVID-19 lockdown, the center developed online courses for FLE teachers, FLE ressources pages,  and foreign language courses for locals.

The Palace of the Congresses is a venue primarily for the conferences of trade associations and learned societies. With 25,000 visitors yearly, the conferences must carry the economic role once held by the hydrotherapy industry, which today counts only 12,000 patients each year. The hydrotherapy business will now have to reorganise itself to take a less strict therapeutic-only role, and adapt to patients' stays shorter than the traditional three weeks.

Building projects 

Under the authority of the local communities, much work is being done on building sites and projects, which will deeply modify Vichy in the years to come. The construction by the Hotel of the Community of Agglomeration in September 2005 on the old site of the "Commercial City" may precede the total restoration of the market hall "Le Grand Marché" (which would cost €5.9 Million) which would be delivered in September 2006. Other projects include the creation of a  mother-child centre in the hospital complex, the restoration of the spa façade (removal of the metal boarding to uncover the original style of 1862), the transformation of the spa into a multi-use center, creation of parks with fountains in place of parking lots, the demolition and the transformation of the buildings in a congested area to create an enterprise center intended to create 800 jobs (opened in early 2008), the construction of a new aquatic stadium including five basins (open since 2008), and motorway connection (opened in early 2015).

Notable people
Valéry Larbaud (1881–1957), writer
Albert Londres (1884–1932), journalist
Raël (born 1946), religious leader and founder of the Raëlian Religious Movement
Wilfried Moimbe (born 1988), footballer

Religion 
A wide variety of faiths are practiced. Various Christian denominations such as diverse Orthodox, Catholic and Protestant churches are found throughout the area along with adherents of Judaism, Islam, Buddhism and others.
 Catholicism: Presbytère Saint-Louis Saint-Blaise de Vichy  at 33 Rue Sainte-Cécile and Presbytère Sainte Jeanne d'Arc at 2 Rue Jeanne d'Arc
 Russian Orthodox Church: the nearby Château de Saint-Hubert in Chavenon
 Calvinism: Église reformée located at 9 Rue de l'Intendance
 Lutheranism: Église Saint-Blaise de Vichy  located on the Rue de l'Église 
 Judaism: the Synagogue of Vichy located at 2 Bis Rue Maréchal Foch
 Islam: the Mosquée al-Rahma located at 51 Allée des Ailes
 Buddhism: the nearby Pagode Phap Vuong in Noyant-d'Allier

Transport

Highway access
Vichy is accessible from departmental road (RD) 2209, former route nationale 209 (from the towns of Gannat or Varennes-sur-Allier), the RD 906e, former RD 906 from Thiers, the RD 1093 from Randan or the RD 6 from Charmeil.

The A719 autoroute, connecting Vichy to the A71 to Clermont-Ferrand, opened in January 2015.

In 2014, only regional two-lane highways (routes départementales) pass through the urban ring of Vichy. The RD 2209 is the principal axis of circulation for heavily loaded trucks, from the west (via Gannat) or the north (via Varennes-sur-Allier or Saint-Germain-des-Fossés) ; other important routes are the following (listed in the clockwise order):
 the RD 906e, former RD 906, from the south (Abrest, Saint-Yorre, Thiers, Ambert, Livradois and Le Puy-en-Velay) ;
 the route nationale 493/RD 1093, from the southwest (Forest of Randan, Grande Limagne, Maringues, Riom, Clermont-Ferrand);
 the RN 684/RD 984, from the west-southwest (Bellerive-sur-Allier, Effiat, Aigueperse);
 the RD 6, from the northwest (Charmeil, Saint-Pourçain-sur-Sioule).

The RD 67 is a loop to the north of the city created to limit traffic jams (access to Creuzier-le-Neuf, afterwards by the RD 907, Lapalisse and the RN 7).

Rail transport

Vichy is served by the following train lines:
 Intercités (national trains, booking mandatory) to Paris (Bercy) and Clermont-Ferrand;
 TER trains: Moulins, Lyon (Part-Dieu and Perrache), Clermont-Ferrand, Vic-le-Comte, Issoire and Brioude.

Public transport
MobiVie is the network of urban transport for six communes of Vichy Communauté intercommunality. This network is composed of eight lines .

"Mobival" is an on-call transportation service for Vichy and its neighborhood. This service offers the local communes a reliable transportation service for areas that are not served by the MobiVie network. Created in October 2004, it has ten lines.

Air transport

Twin towns – sister cities

Vichy is twinned with:
 Bad Tölz, Germany
 Dunfermline, Scotland, United Kingdom

 Rhein-Neckar (district), Germany
 San Giuliano Terme, Italy
 Wilhelmshaven, Germany

See also 
 Communes of the Allier department
 Incident at Vichy
 List of spa towns in France

References

External links 

  (in French)
 
 
 Online books on balneology and the city of Vichy (BU Clermont Auvergne)
 Vichy Minéral 89 - Análisis 2018 

 
Communes of Allier
Spa towns in France
Subprefectures in France
Capitals of former nations
Bourbonnais